Alessandro Cucciari (born 11 September 1969 in Rome) is a retired Italian professional football player, and current coach. He was last in charge as head coach of Lega Pro club Lupa Roma.

Playing career
Cucciari played 3 seasons in the Serie A for AS Roma, Siena and Messina. He won promotion to Serie A on 4 different occasions (Verona 1990–91, Lecce 1996–97, Perugia 1997–98 and Sampdoria 2002–03). Curiously enough, on all 4 occasions he left the team he won the promotion with in the following off-season, before playing for them in the top flight.

Coaching career
In 2013, he took his first coaching role as boss of Eccellenza amateurs Terracina, guiding them to Serie D promotion through playoffs. He then took over at Serie D club Lupa Roma, immediately guiding them to a historical promotion to Lega Pro on his first season in charge. He resigned on 31 October 2015, after achieving only one point in the first nine Lega Pro games. On 29 December 2015, he was reappointed as Lupa Roma coach in place of Agenore Maurizi, but failed to reverse the club's fortunes and was eventually sacked on 17 April 2016.

1969 births
Living people
Italian footballers
Italian football managers
Serie A players
Serie B players
A.S. Roma players
Hellas Verona F.C. players
Modena F.C. players
U.S. Lecce players
A.C. Perugia Calcio players
Ternana Calcio players
U.C. Sampdoria players
A.C.N. Siena 1904 players
A.C.R. Messina players
S.S.D. Lucchese 1905 players
Association football defenders